Lelo for Georgia is a centrist liberal political party in Georgia that was created at the end of 2019 by businessmen Mamuka Khazaradze and Badri Japaridze. The party has attracted a number of prominent political figures and parties (through mergers), including David Usupashvili's Development Movement, the New Rights Party and Pikria Chikhradze. It also has attracted a number of centre-left political figures, such as Grigol Gegelia.

Political ambitions 

The party is seeking to contest the parliamentary elections in Georgia, scheduled for October 2020. The party says that it seeks to "defeat the bipolar system" that it sees as dominant in Georgia. They are close from the opposition alliance which has been formed during early 2020 in order to contest the Georgian Dream parliamentary majority.

Political views 
Lelo for Georgia is a centrist and liberal party, which aims to transcend the dichotomy between the Georgian Dream and the United National Movement, thus putting to an end the bipolar system running in Georgia since 2012.

The party is willing to strengthen the economy, encourage investments in Georgia and to enhance the daily life conditions of the population. The party supports the setting of a minimum wage, parental leave, and the setting of overtime pay rates but does not support the institution of unemployment insurance.

They also claim to wish for the reestablishment of the "rule of law" and to make the judiciary power totally independent from the political class. This will is linked with the controversies linked to trials and arrests which are said to be "politically motivated", such as the case of Giorgi Ugulava. The two founders of the party, Mamuka Khazaradze and Badri Japaridze, were both under investigation for money laundering, which they claimed to be a politically motivated. The Embassy of the United States of America to Georgia observed on July 25, 2019, immediately after the criminal charge was brought against Khazaradze and Japaridze that they were ‘concerned about the context and timing of these charges’. The 2019 US Department of State country report observed the fact that the criminal charges were brought against Khazaradze and Japaridze ‘just weeks after Khazaradze’s July 9 announcement of his intent to establish a civil movement’, also noting that ‘a group of 20 NGOs, including Transparency International/Georgia, the Open Society Fund Georgia, the Atlantic Council of Georgia, and the International Society for Fair Elections and Democracy, considered the charges against all three men to be politically motivated’.  Moreover, the Ombudsperson of Georgia observed that “the case materials do not contain the elements necessary for assessing an action as a crime of money laundering.” In May 2020, Transparency International Georgia published a report prepared by the independent expert, Pauline David, which observed that there is no basis to claim that Khazaradze and Japaridze were involved in money laundering. David’s report explicitly states that: “After an assessment of Georgian and international laws, the Indictment, the facts in issue, and accepted international jurisprudence in money laundering cases, key findings are as follows: There is no evidence from which to infer an intention: to ‘legalise’ (launder) any funds obtained by way of loan; to conceal the ‘illegal origins’ of the loan funds; or to integrate those funds back into the legitimate economy.” The case was dismissed in 2022, as Khazaradze and Japaridze were acquitted of all charges of money laundering.

Origin of the founders 
Prior to setting up the party, Khazaradze and some of his partners had set up a public movement in September 2019. Khazaradze is a co-founder of TBC Bank and of the Anaklia Development Consortium. As of January 2020, the party's program is still under development. At the same time, the party has regularly criticized the government on various policies, including relations with Russia and large infrastructure projects.

Electoral performance

Parliamentary

Local

References

2019 establishments in Georgia (country)
Centrist parties in Asia
Centrist parties in Europe
Classical liberal parties
Liberal parties in Georgia (country)
Political parties established in 2019
Political parties in Georgia (country)
Pro-European political parties in Georgia (country)